Luigi Mion (Cattaro, Dalmatia, June 15, 1843 – 1920) was an Italian painter, active mainly in Venice painting genre subjects.<ref>[https://books.google.com/books?id=gbdGAQAAIAAJ I pittori italiani dell'ottocento: dizionario critico e documentario] , by Agostino Mario Comanducci, 1992, Page 438.</ref>

Biography
Active in Venice. His main works are: Troppo tardi, exhibited in 1872; Mosca cieca, exhibited at the 1878 Universal Exhibition of Paris; Sbagliato, in 1879 at Monaco; La maschera veneziana exhibited at the Salon in 1879; Farfallina; Religione dello Famiglia; Le orfanelli; and Mamma mia. To Venice, in 1887, he displayed: Il Mattino; After the messa; Ai Vesperi; and In San Marco. The latter represent a realistic indoor vedute. he also painted Ragazza all Finestra'' now located in the civic library of Vercelli.

References

19th-century Italian painters
Italian male painters
20th-century Italian painters
1843 births
1920 deaths
Painters from Venice
People from Kotor
19th-century Italian male artists
20th-century Italian male artists